Olli Sipiläinen (born 24 July 1977) is a Finnish ice hockey player currently playing for Jukurit of the Finnish Liiga. Between 2002 and 2006 he played for Mikkelin Jukurit.

Career statistics

References

External links

1977 births
Living people
Finnish ice hockey left wingers
Imatran Ketterä players
JYP-Akatemia players
JYP Jyväskylä players
Mikkelin Jukurit players
People from Lappeenranta
SaiPa players
Lukko players
Sportspeople from South Karelia